For information on all University of Alabama at Birmingham sports, see UAB Blazers

The UAB Blazers baseball team is a varsity intercollegiate athletic team of the University of Alabama at Birmingham in Birmingham, Alabama, United States. The team is a member of Conference USA, which is part of the National Collegiate Athletic Association's Division I. UAB's first baseball team was fielded in 1979. The team plays its home games at Regions Field in Birmingham, Alabama. The Blazers are coached by Casey Dunn.

Blazers in Major League Baseball
Since the Major League Baseball Draft began in 1965, UAB has had 28 players selected.

Notable players include:
Graham Ashcraft
Dan DeMent
Mike Goff
Chris Hammond
Brewer Hicklen
Héctor Villanueva
Garrett Whitlock

See also
List of NCAA Division I baseball programs

References

External links
 

Sports clubs established in 1979